"Hey Boy!" is the second single of Dutch singer Kim-Lian. Released on 9 February 2004, the song was taken from her debut album Balance. The music video for the song was directed by Peter van Eyndt.

Track listing
"Hey Boy!" [Radio Version] - 3:03
"Hey Boy!" [Instrumental] - 3:03
"Hey Boy!" [Enhanced Video] - 3:02

Chart performance

References

2004 singles
Kim-Lian songs
2004 songs